Jørn Lund may refer to 

Jørn Lund (cyclist) (born 1942), Danish cyclist.
Jørn Lund (linguist) (born 1946), Danish professor of linguistics